Michele Paletti (born 1 August 1967) is an Italian racing cyclist. He rode in the 1993 Tour de France.

References

1967 births
Living people
Italian male cyclists
Place of birth missing (living people)